In the 2011-12 season, Al Zawraa will be competing in the Iraqi Premier League and the AFC Cup.

Squad

Transfers

In

Out

Stadium

Competitive
During the season, the stadium of Al Zawraa will be demolished. A company will build a new stadium that will be completed in 2014. Since they can't play their games at Al Zawraa Stadium, they will be playing at Al Shaab Stadium from February 2012.

AFC Cup
Al Zawraa will play their games, in the AFC Cup, at Duhok Stadium. Because of safety concerns they are not allowed to play in Baghdad

Matches

Competitive

Iraqi Premier League

AFC Cup

Group stage

External links
 Goalzz
 Iraqi League

Al Zawraa
Al-Zawraa SC seasons